Heteropterys chrysophylla is a plant species that grows in South America and can be found from Brazil to Argentina.

References

Malpighiaceae